USS Yuma has been the name of five ships of the United States Navy.  The name is taken after the Yuma tribe of Arizona.

  was a river monitor launched in May 1865, but never commissioned, and sold in 1874
  was a tug originally named  and later renamed Yuma; she was sold in 1921
  was a  commissioned in 1943 and transferred to Pakistan in 1959
  was a  medium harbor tug the Navy acquired in 1964 from the US Army, where she had served with the designation LT-2078 since 1954; she was placed out of service in 1976 and sold into commercial service in 1987
  is a 

United States Navy ship names